Liu Yong may refer to:
 Liu Wei (businessman), also called Liu Yong, businessman executed in 2015
 Liu Yong (Xin dynasty), Han dynasty noble and warlord at the end of the Xin dynasty
 Liu Yong (Three Kingdoms), prince of the Shu Han state in the Three Kingdoms period
 Liu Yong (Song dynasty) (987–1053), Song dynasty poet
 Liu Yong (Qing dynasty) (1719–1805), Qing dynasty official
 Liu Yong (painter) (born 1949), Taiwanese writer, painter, and educator
 Liu Yong (badminton) (born 1975), badminton player
 Ge Fei (author) (Liu Yong, born 1964)
 Tony Liu, Hong Kong and Taiwanese actor